Meego is an American science fiction sitcom television series that ran for six episodes from September 19 to October 24, 1997 on the CBS television network as part of its Friday night Block Party program block; after its cancellation, seven additional episodes that were produced but left unaired in the United States were aired in some international markets (such as on Sky1 in the United Kingdom).

Created by Ross Brown, and developed by Thomas L. Miller, Robert L. Boyett, and Michael Warren, the series starred Bronson Pinchot in the title role as an alien masquerading as a human being who, after his spaceship crashlands on Earth, unexpectedly becomes the nanny to a single father's three children.

Synopsis
Meego (Pinchot) is a 9,000-year-old shape-shifting alien from the planet Marmazon 4.0. After his spaceship crashes, he is discovered by three children; Trip (Erik von Detten, later played by Will Estes), Maggie (Michelle Trachtenberg) and Alex Parker (Jonathan Lipnicki). They live with their single father, Dr. Edward Parker (Ed Begley Jr.) and pass Meego off as human (he does not want anyone to know that he is extraterrestrial, and tells people he is from Canada instead). Although he plans to go home as soon as his ship is repaired, he becomes attached to the children and decides to remain on Earth to care for them.

Cast

Main

 Bronson Pinchot as Meego
 Ed Begley Jr. as Dr. Edward Parker
 Michelle Trachtenberg as Maggie Parker
 Erik von Detten (pilot episode only) and Will Estes (episodes 2–13) as Trip Parker
 Jonathan Lipnicki as Alex Parker

Notable guest stars
 Jaleel White in the episodes "Love and Money" and "The Truth About Cars and Dogs" (though seen wearing Urkel's eyeglasses, he appears here in uncredited, non-speaking roles as a disgruntled repossessor and a man who blows a whistle at a pinewood derby race).
 Three cast members of Gilligan's Island, Bob Denver, Dawn Wells, and Russell Johnson, had a guest appearance on the episode "Mommy 'n' Meego", which was unaired in the United States.

Home exteriors
The exteriors of the Parker family home on Meego had been recycled from an earlier Miller-Boyett series, On Our Own. The footage of the home was filmed in a suburb of St. Louis, where On Our Own was set; however, in episode "Magic Parker", reference is made to "the greater Chicago area".

Episodes

Broadcast
Meego was commissioned specifically for the CBS Block Party, an effort to compete with TGIF, the long-running family comedy block on ABC. Incoming CBS head Leslie Moonves saw an opportunity to take advantage of an ownership change at ABC (then being acquired by The Walt Disney Company, which was reshaping TGIF into a more teen-oriented block) and offered Miller-Boyett Productions US$40 million to bring two of TGIF's programs, Family Matters and Step by Step, to CBS. As part of the deal, Miller-Boyett also received the right to produce a new show, which became Meego.

Meego was unusual among the shows in the CBS Block Party in that it was targeted mainly at children, instead of the whole family. This was a factor in the show's failure; by this point, the show's lead-in, Family Matters, consisted mostly of a cast of young adults, and its lead-out, The Gregory Hines Show (the only show on the block to be produced by CBS and Columbia TriStar Television and with no ties to either Warner Bros. or Miller-Boyett), was also a mostly adult-oriented sitcom. Another factor in the show's failure was its direct competition; Boy Meets World, the program that aired on TGIF opposite Meego, reached its peak in number of viewers during the 1997–98 season. Meego was pulled from the air after six episodes. After holiday specials filled the slot for the next several weeks, Kids Say the Darndest Things replaced Meego on the CBS schedule in January 1998.

Critical reception

The show received mixed to negative reviews.

Awards and nominations

References

External links
 
 

1997 American television series debuts
1997 American television series endings
1990s American comic science fiction television series
1990s American sitcoms
CBS original programming
English-language television shows
Television series about alien visitations
Television series about single parent families
Television series about shapeshifting
Television series by Warner Bros. Television Studios
Television shows set in Missouri